Gordon Walker (born c. 1972) is a Zimbabwean-born New Zealand canoe racing coach and former multi sport athlete. He won the Coast to Coast race in 2007, 2009 and 2010.  He is currently the head coach of the women's programme at Canoe Racing NZ, a programme that includes Olympic gold-medal winning canoeist Lisa Carrington. He moved to New Zealand from Zimbabwe when he was six years old, along with his two brothers and his parents. At the age of nine, he attended Southwell Boarding School in Hamilton, and at thirteen he attended kings college.  
He studied at Auckland University and got a bachelor of science.

References

External links 
Gordon Walker's Journey Part 1 at the CRNZ website
Gordon Walker's Journey Part 2 at the CRNZ website

|-

1980s births
Living people
New Zealand sports coaches
New Zealand Olympic coaches
New Zealand people of English descent
New Zealand people of Scottish descent
Zimbabwean emigrants to New Zealand